This is a list of gomphothere fossils found in South America. Gomphotheres were elephant-like mammals that lived from the Middle Miocene (approximately 12 million years ago) to the Holocene (6000 years BP).

The following species have been described in twentieth and twenty-first century paleontological literature about South America.
An alternative proposal is considered within the scientific community, listed below.

Modern classification
 Cuvieronius 
 C. hyodon  (type)
 Notiomastodon 
 N. platensis  (type)

Former classification 

Original classification
 Gomphotheriidae
 Cuvieroniinae
 Cuvieronius 
 C. arellanoi 
 C. hyodon (=C. humboldti)  (type)
 C. priestleyi 
 C. tarijensis 
 C. tropicus  (=C. oligobunis )
 Haplomastodon 
 H. chimborazi 
 H. guayasensis 
 H. waringi  (type)
 Notiomastodon 
 N. ornatus (=S. platensis)
 N. platensis  (type)
 N. vidali 
 Stegomastodon 
 S. mirificus  (= "S. successor, S. arizonae, S. texanus") (type)
 S. platensis 
 S. primitivus  (=S. rexroadensis)
 S. superbus 
 S. waringi

Gomphothere fossil finds 
Formations are ordered according to their youngest age

Argentina

Bolivia

Brazil

Chile

Colombia

Ecuador

Paraguay

Peru

Uruguay

Venezuela

Proposed reclassification 
Some authors, Lucas, Mothé, Avilla et al., propose a reclassification of the South American gomphotheres as follows:
 Stegomastodon  is an exclusively North American genus
 Haplomastodon  is a South American genus, but synonymous with Notiomastodon 
 as Notiomastodon was defined earlier, all Haplomastodon species should be considered part of Notiomastodon
 all formerly described species as Stegomastodon sp., Haplomastodon sp. and Notiomastodon sp. belong to a single species; Notiomastodon platensis
 Cuvieronius is the only remaining South American genus outside of Notiomastodon, containing the single local species C. hyodon

Other researchers as Labarca, Prado and Alberdi agree with the placement of species into Notiomastodon, but reject the idea of a single species. They continue to use Stegomastodon waringi for South American gomphotheres from Chile.

Evolution 
 Lucas (2010, 2013) proposes that Notiomastodon evolved from Cuvieronius inside South America
 Mothé et al. (2012, 2015, 2016) propose that Notiomastodon and Cuvieronius reached South America in two separate migration waves

Gallery

See also 

 Gomphothere
 Great American Biotic Interchange
 South American land mammal ages
 List of fossil primates of South America

Notes and references

Notes

References

Bibliography 
Publications are in chronological order, most recent first, because of the advances in taxonomy and research

Publications South America

Publications Argentina

Publications Bolivia

Publications Brazil

Publications Chile

Publications Colombia

Publications Ecuador

Publications Paraguay

Publications Peru

Publications Uruguay

Publications Venezuela

Publications proposed reclassification 
 
 
 
 
 
 

South America
Gomphotheres
Gomphotheres
Gomphotheres
Gomphotheres
Gomphotheres
Gomphotheres
Gomphotheres
Gomphotheres
Gomphotheres
Gomphotheres
Gomphotheres
Gomphotheres
Gomphotheres
Gomphotheres
Gomphotheres
Gomphotheres
Gomphotheres
Gomphotheres
Gomphotheres
Gomphotheres
Gomphotheres
Gomphotheres
Gomphotheres
Gomphotheres
Gomphotheres
Gompotheres
†Gomphotheres